Adrien Goybet (1922–1995) was the son of Admiral Pierre Goybet and grandson of General Mariano Goybet. He served as chef de bataillon in the Fusiliers Marins. He trained with British Force 136, the Southeast Asian branch of the Special Operations Executive, the British military espionage and covert action force.

In 1945, he parachuted into Cambodia, at that time occupied by the Japanese.  He prepared the landing of the troops of General Leclerc.  He served in the Indo-Chinese Campaign (1951–1954) as an intelligence officer, and in the Algerian campaign (1958–1961).
 
He was a Chevalier of the Legion of Honor. The family has three generations of Legion of Honour recipients. The association of hereditary honors (A.H.H.) associates all the families who have the necessary credentials.  (Regulation of 1814 by Louis XVIII “to perpetuate in families the zeal for the good of the state by honourable souvenirs”)

Sources

- Les Goybet de la vallée de Yenne, 25.08.64, Henri Jaillard consultable aux Archives de Savoie.

- Bulletin AHH no 29 novembre 1987. Notice sur famille Goybet écrite par Monsieur Pierre Jaillard Président de l'héraldique de France 

- La famille Montgolfier par Leon Rostaing, Éditions A.Rey 1910, p. 316 à 319 et p. 325.

External links 

  Link on the family of chevalier Henri Goybet: Famille du Chevalier Henri Goybet, by Henri Goybet (member of the family)

Alumni of Lycée Lyautey (Casablanca)
French Special Operations Executive personnel
French military personnel of World War II
French military personnel of the First Indochina War
French Navy officers
Chevaliers of the Légion d'honneur
Intelligence analysts
1922 births
1995 deaths
French expatriates in Cambodia